Toorak may refer to:
Toorak, Victoria, an inner south-eastern suburb of Melbourne
Toorak College, Mount Eliza, approximately 40 km south of Melbourne
Toorak Gardens, South Australia, an inner eastern suburb of Adelaide initially named Toorak
Toorak Handicap, a thoroughbred horse race held in Melbourne
Toorak House, Toorak, Victoria
Toorak Park, Armadale, Victoria
Toorak railway station, Melbourne
Toorak Shule, the oldest Jewish congregation in Melbourne
Toorak Tractor, Melbourne slang for a (luxury) sport utility vehicle
Toorak Village, a shopping precinct in Toorak, Victoria
Electoral district of Toorak, a former Victorian Legislative Assembly electorate
Tõõrakõrve, a village in Estonia